Raúl André Freitas Martins (born 3 February 1987) is a Portuguese football player of Angolan descent who plays for UD Oliveirense.

Club career
He made his professional debut in the Segunda Liga for Naval on 23 September 2012 in a game against Tondela.

References

1987 births
Footballers from Porto
Portuguese sportspeople of Angolan descent
Living people
Portuguese footballers
S.C. Praiense players
AC Vila Meã players
F.C. Vizela players
Gondomar S.C. players
Associação Naval 1º de Maio players
Liga Portugal 2 players
Académico de Viseu F.C. players
Atlético Clube de Portugal players
Varzim S.C. players
U.D. Oliveirense players
Association football defenders
F.C. Oliveira do Hospital players